Advanced Chemical Industries, more commonly marketed and known as  ACI (CSE: ACI, DSE: ACI) is a Bangladeshi pharmaceuticals and conglomorate company founded in 1973. The firm is headquartered in the thana of Tejgaon I/A, in Dhaka. ACI is one of the leading firms in the pharmaceuticals and chemical industry of Bangladesh. 

Advanced Chemical Industries (ACI) Limited, being one of the largest conglomerates in Bangladesh with a multinational heritage operates across the country through its four diversified strategic business units.

 ACI Pharmaceuticals:- It aims to improve the health of the people of Bangladesh through the introduction of innovative and reliable pharmaceuticals products. 
 ACI Consumer Brands:- It supplies daily life consumers goods such as toiletries, home care goods, hygiene, electricals and consumer electronics, paints, and cooking essentials such as salt, flour, rice, tea, and edible oil. 
 ACI Agribusinesses:- It is the largest integrator in Bangladesh in agriculture, livestock, fisheries, farm mechanization, infrastructure development services, and motorcycle. 
 ACI Retail Chain:- is the largest retail chain in Bangladesh operating through its 144 Shwapno outlets including 34 express outlets across the country by touching the lives of over 45,000 households each day.

History
In 1968, Imperial Chemical Industries, a British multinational company established a branch in then-East Pakistan. After Bangladesh gained independence in 1971, the company was incorporated on 24 January 1973 as ICI Bangladesh Manufacturers Limited and also as Public Limited Company. On 5 May 1992, ICI divested its investment in Bangladesh to the management when its name was changed to Advanced Chemical Industries (ACI) Limited. The company sold its insect control, air care, and toilet care brands to SC Johnson & Son in 2015. The company contributed taka 4,318 million to the national exchequer during FY 2019–2020 in the form of corporate tax, customs duty and value-added tax.

Sister concerns
 ACI Formulations Limited
 ACI Salt Limited
 ACI Pure Flour Limited
 ACI Foods Limited
 ACI Agrolink Limited
 Creative Communication Limited
 Premiaflex Plastics Limited
 ACI Motors Limited (Yamaha)
 ACI Logistics Limited (Shwapno)
 ACI Edible Oils Limited
 ACI HealthCare Limited
 ACI Chemicals Limited
 INFOLYTX Bangladesh Limited
 ACI Biotech Limited
 ACI Marine and Riverine Technologies Limited

List of joint venture companies
 Tetley ACI (Bangladesh) Limited
 Asian Consumer Care (Pvt.) Limited
 ACI Godrej  Agrovet Private Limited
 ACI CO-RO Bangladesh Ltd.
 Stochastic Logic Limited.

See also
 List of companies of Bangladesh

References

External links
 ACI Limited Official website
 ACI Fertilzier Official website
 ACI Pharma profile on Pharma Mirror Magazine

Conglomerate companies of Bangladesh
1992 establishments in Bangladesh